Idaho Legislative District 26 is one of 35 districts of the Idaho Legislature. It is currently represented by Senator Michelle Stennett, Democrat  of Ketchum, Representative Ned Burns, Democrat of Bellevue, and Representative Sally Toone, Democrat of Gooding.

District profile (2012–present) 
District 26 currently consists of all of Blaine, Camas, Gooding, and Lincoln Counties.

District profile (2002–2012) 
From 2002 to 2012, District 26 consisted of all of Minidoka and Jerome Counties.

District profile (1992–2002) 
From 1992 to 2002, District 26 consisted of all of Clark, Custer, Jefferson, and Lemhi Counties.

See also

 List of Idaho Senators
 List of Idaho State Representatives

References

External links
Idaho Legislative District Map (with members)
Idaho Legislature (official site)

26
Blaine County, Idaho
Camas County, Idaho
Gooding County, Idaho
Lincoln County, Idaho